Wysoka Gryfińska  (German Wittstock) is a settlement in the administrative district of Gmina Gryfino, within Gryfino County, West Pomeranian Voivodeship, in north-western Poland, close to the German border. 

References

Villages in Gryfino County